Chiroteuthis imperator, or the emperor squid is a species of chiroteuthid squid. It lives off the coast of Sumatra in the Indo-Pacific Ocean.. It grows to a mantle length of 30 cm, and has incredibly long arms which give it a total length of probably 1,6m..

References

Squid
Molluscs described in 1908